True at Heart is the third solo album of the German female hard rock singer Doro Pesch. It was recorded in Nashville, Tennessee and released in August 1991.

The third studio album of the former Warlock singer Doro Pesch is another exploration in new musical territory. Barry Beckett, a famous and seasoned mainstream music producer, was chosen to produce the album and a large number of authors and musicians living and working in Nashville, the recording haven of country music, participated in the recording sessions. The result is an album with many ballads, few uptempo songs and a pronounced blues influence.

The working of this album marks the beginning of the collaboration between Doro Pesch and Nashville guitarist Gary Scruggs.

Track listing

Personnel
Musicians
 Doro Pesch – vocals
 Michael Thompson, Dann Huff – lead guitars
 Kenny Greenberg, Gordon Kennedy, Dennis Morgan, Don Potter – guitars
 Mike Lawler – keyboards
 Barry Beckett – piano, producer
 Leland Sklar – bass
 Eddie Bayers – drums
 Jim Horn – alto saxophone
 Todd Cerney, Bob DiPiero, Chris Eddy, Robert White Johnson, Tony Seals, Troy Seals – backing vocals

Production
 Jeff Balding, Jim DeMain – engineers, mixing
 Doug Sax – mastering
 Ragena Warden  – production coordinator

References

External links
 American site
 "Fall for Me Again" video clip

Doro (musician) albums
1991 albums
Vertigo Records albums
Albums produced by Barry Beckett